Alessandro De Botton (born 15 October 1970) is an Italian diver. He competed in two events at the 1992 Summer Olympics.

References

1970 births
Living people
Italian male divers
Olympic divers of Italy
Divers at the 1992 Summer Olympics
Divers from Rome